Intuitor is a website promoting creative learning as both a method of enlightenment and a cultural theme in its own right.  Created in 1996, two of its earliest features were instructions for the founder's own four-handed chess variant Forchess and an essay entitled Why Now Is the Most Exciting Time in History to Be Alive.  Today, its eclectic format includes educational treatments of physics, statistics, and chess, as well as calls for paradigm shifts such as the adoption of hexadecimal for representing numbers in everyday use.

Insultingly Stupid Movie Physics 

Intuitor's most well-known feature is Insultingly Stupid Movie Physics (ISMP), which produces original scientific critiques of contemporary cinema and television.  Its main gimmick is a physics rating system parodying the explicit content ratings of the Motion Picture Association of America. Its movie reviews seek to promote a greater understanding of and appreciation for science by lampooning scientific portrayals in pop-culture.  It has been cited on popular websites such as Fark and Slashdot, on radio programs throughout the U.S. and Canada, and in major print media.  The ISMP was also Something Awful's awful link of the day on June 14, 2006.  In calling for "Decency in Movie Physics", ISMP has named the science-fiction film The Core as the "Worst Physics Movie Ever".

External links 

 Intuitor

American educational websites